Aneta Kowal (born November 28, 1991) is an American model.

Kowal currently lives in Detroit and is studying pre-medical studies at Oakland University in Oakland County.

In July 2013, Kowal won Playboy's Miss Social contest. She has been Miss Michigan Hooters 2012 and 2014, and has featured in the reality TV-show Hooters 2012 International Swimsuit Pageant that accompanied the final competition. For the magazine SnapMatter, on the Swimsuit Edition vol. 6, 2012 she featured as the centerfold girl. Kowal has been the cover model of the magazine Nine5Four in Issue 51. On the 9th December 2013 Kowal featured as the Fox-y Lady of the day on Fox Sports. She has appeared several times on Maxim.com.

References

External links
 Aneta Kowal on Playboy miss social
 Aneta Kowal on playmates.com
 
 Aneta Kowal on Model Mayhem

Playboy people
People from Detroit
American people of Polish descent
1991 births
Living people
Oakland University alumni